Edward Berkeley (c. 16441707) was an English politician.

He was the son of Edward Berkeley of Pylle, Somerset and educated at Wadham College, Oxford and Lincoln's Inn (1665).
 
He was the Member of Parliament for Wells, Somerset from 1679 to 1701.

He married Elizabeth, the daughter and coheiress of John Ryves of Ranston, Dorset and had 3 sons (1 of whom predeceased him) and 3 daughters.

References

1640s births
1707 deaths
Year of birth uncertain
English MPs 1679
English MPs 1685–1687
English MPs 1689–1690
English MPs 1690–1695
English MPs 1695–1698
English MPs 1698–1700
English MPs 1701